Holy Names High School may refer to:

 Holy Names High School (Windsor, Ontario), Canada
 Holy Names High School (Oakland, California), United States

See also 
 Academy of the Holy Names (disambiguation)
 Holy Names Academy, Seattle, Washington, United States
 Holy Name High School, Parma Heights, Ohio, United States